The surnames: Cizmar/Cismar/Chizmar/Chismar (English), Čižmár/Čižmárova (f.) (Slovak), Čižmář/Čižmárová (f.) (Czech), Ciżmar (Polish),  Čizmar (Serbian), Čizmar/Čižmar (Croatian), Csizmar (Hungarian), Čižman (Slovenian), Cizmar/Cismar (Romanian) and Cizmar/Cismar/Zhishman (German) are of occupational origin, literally meaning 'shoemaker, cobbler', from the word čižma, which means boot, and added suffixes -ar/-an, common in Slavic and Romanian languages.

The surnames may refer to:

Boris Čizmar,  Serbian futsal player
Albin Čižman, Slovenian slalom canoer
Tomaž Čižman, Slovenian alpine skier
Miloš Čižmář (cs), Czech archaeologist
Josef Čižmář (cs), Czech folklorist
Joseph von Zhishman (a.k.a. Josip/Jožef Čižman), Austrian lawyer and specialist in canon law
Paula Cizmar, American academic, playwright and librettist.

References